Malcolm John "Mac" Stokes (20 May 1909 – 29 May 2003) was an Australian rules footballer who played with Geelong in the Victorian Football League (VFL).

Family
The son of Archibald Stokes (1872–1945), and Agnes Stokes (1875–1957), née Gibbs, Malcolm John Stokes was born at Maffra West Upper, Victoria on 20 May 1909.

He married Thelma Grinter in 1932.

Football

Barwon (GDFA)
He played for the Barwon Football Club in the Geelong and District Football Association (GDFA).

Geelong (VFL)
He was recruited by Geelong in 1929.

Barwon (GDFL)
In 1934 he was cleared from Geelong to the Barwon Football Club in the recently renamed Geelong and District Football League (GDFL).

Military service
He served in the Australian Defence Forces during the Second World War.

Notes

References
 
 [https://nominal-rolls.dva.gov.au/veteran?id=655411&c=WW2 World War Two Nominal Roll: Private Malcolm John Stokes (V379295), Department of Veterans' Affairs'.]
 B884, V379295: World War Two Service Record: Private Malcolm John Stokes (V379295), National Archives of Australia''.

External links 
 
 

1909 births
2003 deaths
Australian rules footballers from Victoria (Australia)
Barwon Football Club players
Geelong Football Club players